Ivana Uhlířová (born 23 July 1980) is a Czech actress. After being named Talent of the Year at the 2006 Alfréd Radok Awards, she won the Alfréd Radok Award for Best Actress in 2010 for her role of Alžběta in the Ödön von Horváth play Víra, láska, naděje at the Divadlo Komedie in Prague. She made her film debut in the 2003 movie Boredom in Brno.

References

External links

1980 births
Living people
People from Rýmařov
Czech television actresses
Czech film actresses
Czech stage actresses
21st-century Czech actresses